Balasaheb may refer to:

Balasaheb Deoras, also known as Madhukar Dattatraya Deoras (died 1996), third Sarsanghchalak of RSS
Balasaheb Thackeray, also known as Bal Keshav Thackeray, founder and leader of Shivsena
Balasaheb Vikhe Patil (1932–2016), 14th Lok Sabha member
Balasaheb Gangadhar Kher, former chief minister of Maharashtra